John Colton (December 31, 1887 – December 26, 1946) was an American playwright and screenwriter born in Minneapolis, Minnesota. He spent the first 14 years of his life in Japan where his English father was a diplomat. After returning to the US he soon worked for a Minneapolis newspaper.

He is best remembered for adapting, with Clemence Randolph, Somerset Maugham's novella Rain into a  1922 smash hit play starring Jeanne Eagels. He wrote the original play, The Shanghai Gesture, produced on Broadway in 1926. He excelled at writing plays dealing with Americans in far-off lands, an experience Colton knew firsthand from his early youth in Japan. With these huge successes Colton was lured to Hollywood, primarily MGM, where he wrote intertitles for some silent films and scenarios for others. In the talking film era he wrote numerous screenplays. Three of his stage plays found motion picture production: Rain (1932); The Shanghai Gesture (1941); and, posthumously, Under Capricorn (1949).

His 1933 play Nine Pine Street, written with Carleton Miles, was based around the Lizzie Borden story. Lizzie Borden's character was changed to "Effie Holden", played by Lillian Gish. It ran for only 28 performances.

Colton suffered a stroke in 1945. He died of a second stroke in Gainesville, Texas in 1946. Colton, a gay man, never married.

References

External links

 John Colton, in 1935 back row in specs & tie standing with several literary friends i.e. Blanche Oelrichs, Dorothy Parker, Peggy Wood, Howard Greer, Dudley Murphy 
 The Shanghai Gesture printed programme, the West Coast production (additional notes on Broadway production), Biltmore Theatre, Los Angeles, June 1927
 isolated headshot image of Colton from 1935 group photo

1887 births
1946 deaths
Writers from Minneapolis
American gay writers
American male dramatists and playwrights
20th-century American dramatists and playwrights
American LGBT screenwriters
American LGBT dramatists and playwrights
20th-century American male writers